In programming languages (especially functional programming languages) and type theory, an option type or maybe type is a polymorphic type that represents encapsulation of an optional value; e.g., it is used as the return type of functions which may or may not return a meaningful value when they are applied. It consists of a constructor which either is empty (often named None or Nothing), or which encapsulates the original data type A (often written Just A or Some A).

A distinct, but related concept outside of functional programming, which is popular in object-oriented programming, is called nullable types (often expressed as A?). The core difference between option types and nullable types is that option types support nesting (e.g. Maybe (Maybe String) ≠ Maybe String), while nullable types do not (e.g. String?? = String?).

Theoretical aspects

In type theory, it may be written as: . This is reflected in programming by the fact that in languages having tagged unions, option types can be expressed as the tagged union of the encapsulated type plus a unit type.

In the Curry–Howard correspondence, option types are related to the annihilation law for ∨: x∨1=1.

An option type can also be seen as a collection containing either one or zero elements.

The option type is also a monad where:

return = Just -- Wraps the value into a maybe

Nothing  >>= f = Nothing -- Fails if the previous monad fails
(Just x) >>= f = f x     -- Succeeds when both monads succeed

The monadic nature of the option type is useful for efficiently tracking failure and errors.

Examples

Agda 

C++ 

Coq 

Elm 

F# 

let showValue =
    Option.fold (fun _ x -> sprintf "The value is: %d" x) "No value"

let full = Some 42
let empty = None

showValue full |> printfn "showValue full -> %s"
showValue empty |> printfn "showValue empty -> %s"

showValue full -> The value is: 42
showValue empty -> No value

Haskell 

showValue :: Maybe Int -> String
showValue = foldl (\_ x -> "The value is: " ++ show x) "No value"

main :: IO
main = do
    let full = Just 42
    let empty = Nothing

    putStrLn $ "showValue full -> " ++ showValue full
    putStrLn $ "showValue empty -> " ++ showValue empty

showValue full -> The value is: 42
showValue empty -> No value

Idris 

showValue : Maybe Int -> String
showValue = foldl (\_, x => "The value is " ++ show x) "No value"

main : IO
main = do
    let full = Just 42
    let empty = Nothing

    putStrLn $ "showValue full -> " ++ showValue full
    putStrLn $ "showValue empty -> " ++ showValue empty

showValue full -> The value is: 42
showValue empty -> No value

Nim 

import std/options

proc showValue(opt: Option[int]): string =
  opt.map(proc (x: int): string = "The value is: " & $x).get("No value")

let
  full = some(42)
  empty = none(int)

echo "showValue(full) -> ", showValue(full)
echo "showValue(empty) -> ", showValue(empty)

showValue(full) -> The Value is: 42
showValue(empty) -> No value

OCaml 

let show_value =
  Option.fold ~none:"No value" ~some:(fun x -> "The value is: " ^ string_of_int x)

let =
  let full = Some 42 in
  let empty = None in

  print_endline ("show_value full -> " ^ show_value full);
  print_endline ("show_value empty -> " ^ show_value empty)

show_value full -> The value is: 42
show_value empty -> No value

Rust 

fn show_value(opt: Option<i32>) -> String {
    opt.map_or("No value".to_owned(), |x| format!("The value is: {}", x))
}

fn main() {
    let full = Some(42);
    let empty = None;

    println!("show_value(full) -> {}", show_value(full));
    println!("show_value(empty) -> {}", show_value(empty));
}

show_value(full) -> The value is: 42
show_value(empty) -> No value

Scala 

object Main {
  def showValue(opt: Option[Int]): String =
    opt.fold("No value")(x => s"The value is: $x")

  def main(args: Array[String]): Unit = {
    val full = Some(42)
    val empty = None

    println(s"showValue(full) -> ${showValue(full)}")
    println(s"showValue(empty) -> ${showValue(empty)}")
  }
}

showValue(full) -> The value is: 42
showValue(empty) -> No value

Standard ML 

Swift 

func showValue(_ opt: Int?) -> String {
    return opt.map { "The value is: \($0)" } ?? "No value"
}

let full = 42
let empty: Int? = nil

print("showValue(full) -> \(showValue(full))")
print("showValue(empty) -> \(showValue(empty))")

showValue(full) -> The value is: 42
showValue(empty) -> No value

Zig 

In Zig, add ? before the type name like ?32 to make it optional type.

const std = @import("std");

fn showValue(allocator: std.mem.Allocator, opt: ?i32) ![]u8 {
    return if (opt) |n|
        std.fmt.allocPrint(allocator, "The value is: {}", .{n})
    else
        std.fmt.allocPrint(allocator, "No value", .{});
}

pub fn main() !void {
    // Set up an allocator, and warn if we forget to free any memory.
    var gpa = std.heap.GeneralPurposeAllocator(.{}){};
    defer std.debug.assert(!gpa.deinit());
    const allocator = gpa.allocator();

    // Prepare the standard output stream.
    const stdout = std.io.getStdOut().writer();

    // Perform our example.
    const full = 42;
    const empty = null;

    const full_msg = try showValue(allocator, full);
    defer allocator.free(full_msg);
    try stdout.print("showValue(allocator, full) -> {s}\n", .{full_msg});

    const empty_msg = try showValue(allocator, empty);
    defer allocator.free(empty_msg);
    try stdout.print("showValue(allocator, empty) -> {s}\n", .{empty_msg});
}

showValue(allocator, full) -> The value is: 42 
showValue(allocator, empty) -> No value

See also 
 Result type
 Tagged union
 Nullable type
 Null object pattern
 Exception handling
 Pattern matching

References 

Functional programming
Data types
Type theory